Gary Roughead ( "rough head"; born July 15, 1951) is a former United States Navy officer who served as the 29th Chief of Naval Operations from September 29, 2007 to September 22, 2011. He previously served as Commander, United States Fleet Forces Command, from May 17 to September 29, 2007. Prior to that, Roughead served as the 31st Commander, United States Pacific Fleet from July 8, 2005, to May 8, 2007. He retired from the U.S. Navy after 38 years of service.

Early life and education
Roughhead was born July 15, 1951 in Buffalo, New York. Roughead graduated from high school at Valley Forge Military Academy in Wayne, Pennsylvania, in 1969. He is a 1973 graduate of the United States Naval Academy and a Surface Warfare Officer.

Naval career

Roughead's initial assignment was in the Weapons Department aboard . He was the commissioning Chief Engineer aboard  and Executive Officer on board .

Roughead's tours ashore include assignments as Flag Lieutenant to Commander, Naval Surface Force, United States Atlantic Fleet; the Surface Warfare Analyst at the Navy's Office of Program Appraisal; Administrative Aide to the Secretary of the Navy; Executive Assistant to the Commander-in-Chief, United States Pacific Command; Commandant, United States Naval Academy; the Department of the Navy's Chief of Legislative Affairs; and Deputy Commander, United States Pacific Command.

Roughead was the commissioning Commanding Officer of the Aegis destroyer , and, upon assuming command of the cruiser , he became the first naval officer to command both classes of Aegis ships. While he was in command, Port Royal was awarded a Meritorious Unit Commendation and received the Golden Anchor Award for excellence in retention and crew support programs. He was Commander, Cruiser Destroyer Group Two and the  Carrier Battle Group, deploying to the Persian Gulf and Mediterranean Sea. His latest assignment afloat was as Commander, United States Second Fleet and Commander, NATO Striking Fleet Atlantic and Commander, Naval Forces North Fleet East in Norfolk, Virginia; he was nominated to head the Fleet Forces Command on March 19, 2007.

On September 2, 2005, Roughead was a keynote speaker at the End of WWII Commemoration aboard the battleship  Memorial on Ford Island in Hawaii.

Chief of Naval Operations
On September 29, 2007, Roughead became the Chief of Naval Operations.

In January 2009, Roughead was present with President Barack Obama as they watched the inaugural parade in Washington, D.C.

In 2011, Roughead retired from the U.S. Navy after 38 years of service and was succeeded in his post as the Chief of Naval Operations by Admiral Jonathan Greenert.

Personal life
After retirement Roughead became a board member of Theranos, a now-defunct privately held health technology company known for its false claims to have devised revolutionary blood tests using very small amounts of blood. He sits on the executive committee of the Maritime Policy & Strategy Research Center (HMS). Roughhead is a distinguished fellow at the Hoover Institution, a conservative think tank and a member of the Board of Managers for the Johns Hopkins Applied Physics Laboratory.

Awards and decorations

Roughead is also a distinguished recipient of the "Bob Hope Five Star Award for Distinguished Service to America."
The Asian-American Government Executives Network (AAGEN) recognized Roughead with the AAGEN Excellence in Public Service Award June 10, 2010.

References

External links

 Official Navy biography 
 Gary Roughead, profile at whorunsgov.com (Washington Post)
 

|-

1951 births
Chiefs of Naval Operations
Joint Chiefs of Staff
Living people
Recipients of the Distinguished Service Medal (US Army)
Recipients of the Legion of Merit
United States Naval Academy alumni
United States Navy admirals
Recipients of the Defense Superior Service Medal
Recipients of the Defense Distinguished Service Medal
Recipients of the Navy Distinguished Service Medal
Grand Cordons of the Order of the Rising Sun
Theranos people
Valley Forge Military Academy and College alumni